The following highways are numbered 767:

Canada

United States